Irwin Allan Rose (July 16, 1926 – June 2, 2015) was an American biologist.  Along with Aaron Ciechanover and Avram Hershko, he was awarded the 2004 Nobel Prize in Chemistry for the discovery of ubiquitin-mediated protein degradation.

Education and early life
Rose was born in Brooklyn, New York, into a secular Jewish family, the son of Ella (Greenwald) and Harry Royze, who owned a flooring store. Rose attended Washington State University for one year prior to serving in the Navy during World War II.  Upon returning from the war he received his Bachelor of Science degree in 1948 and his PhD in biochemistry in 1952, both from the University of Chicago. He did his post-doctoral studies at NYU.

Career and research
Rose served on the faculty of Yale School of Medicine's department of biochemistry from 1954 to 1963. He then joined the Fox Chase Cancer Center in 1963 and stayed there until he retired in 1995. He joined University of Pennsylvania during the 1970s and served as a Professor of Physical Biochemistry. He was a distinguished professor-in-residence in the Department of Physiology and Biophysics at the University of California, Irvine School of Medicine at the time his Nobel Prize was announced in 2004.

Irwin (Ernie) trained several postdoctoral research fellows while at the Fox Chase Cancer Center in Philadelphia. These included Art Haas, the first to see Ubiquitin chains, Keith Wilkinson, the one to first identify APF-1 as Ubiquitin, and Cecile Pickart.

Published work

When Irwin Rose started on his prizewinning work on ubiquitin he was already very distinguished as an enzymologist.

Classical enzymology

Only a selection of Rose's very extensive work in this field is mentioned here.

In collaboration with Marianne Grunberg-Manago, Saul Korey and Severo Ochoa he investigated the Mg2+- or Mn2+-dependent formation of acetyl-CoA from acetate and ATP catalyzed by acetate kinase, an essential reaction for priming the tricarboxylate cycle, describing the purification of the enzyme and measuring the equilibrium constant of the reaction.

With Edward O'Connell, Rose investigated the mechanisms of the reaction catalyzed by phosphoglucose isomerase and, with Sidney Rieder, of triose phosphate isomerase

With Jessie Warms, he studied the mechanism of hexokinase of sarcoma tumor, finding that it was located in the mitochondria of liver and brain, and bound in accord with a Mg2+-dependent equilibrium.

He had a general interest in the role of magnesium in cells, and studied it on the basis of the equilibrium of the reaction catalyzed by adenylate kinase, a complicated question, because numerous complexes of Mg2+, H+ and K+ with ATP, ADP and AMP need to be taken into account.

Starting from Ogston's theory, Rose was concerned with the stereochemistry of enzyme-catalysed reactions, investigating various enzymes, and later glutamine synthetase. This was the topic of a review article written with Kenneth Hanson.

Ubiquitin

After its discovery by Gideon Goldstein and colleagues in 1975, ubiquitin was extensively studied by Rose, with Avram Hershko, Aaron Ciechanover, A. L. Haas and H. Heller, one of many papers on the subject.

Awards and honors
Rose was awarded the Nobel prize in 2004.

Personal life
Rose was married to Zelda Budenstein and had four children. He died on June 2, 2015 at Deerfield, Massachusetts. His widow died in 2016.

References

External links 
  including the Nobel Lecture on December 8, 2004 Ubiquitin at Fox Chase

1926 births
2015 deaths
American biologists
American Nobel laureates
Jewish American scientists
Members of the United States National Academy of Sciences
Nobel laureates in Chemistry
People from Spokane, Washington
University of California, Irvine faculty
University of Chicago alumni
United States Navy personnel of World War II
Fox Chase Cancer Center people